The 2022 Quintana Roo gubernatorial election was held on 5 June 2022 to elect a new governor of Quintana Roo and 25 deputies to the state congress. Despite Carlos Joaquín González being a popular incumbent governor from the Party of the Democratic Revolution and the National Action Party the race was considered as a long shot due to the state's high approval of López Obrador, Morena's strong showing in the midterms and Mara Lezama's own popularity. On November 3rd 2021 it was revealed Marko Cortés, the leader of the National Action Party expected to loose the state along with other four in play. The election resulted in a landslide for Mexico’s ruling Morena party during President López Obrador's first term in office, winning the gubernatorial election, aditionally, they won all 15 local districs with the opposition only getting proportional representation seats.

Organization

Political Parties 
In the local elections, 10 political parties have the right to participate. They include seven national parties (PRI, PAN, PRD, PT, PVEM, MC, MORENA) and three local parties (FxM, MAS, CQR).

Electoral Process 
The eight-week gubernatorial campaigning period lasted from 3 April to 1 June, while the six-week state congress campaigning period lasted from 18 April to June 1. The voting took place on 5 June 2022, from 8 a.m. to 6 p.m.

Alliances and Candidates

Va por Quintana Roo 
The National Action Party and the Party of the Democratic Revolution agreed to being in coalition for the gubernatorial election. The Institutional Revolutionary Party decided against forming part of the alliance. In January 7, the coalition registered its integration, conformed by three parties, National Action Party, Party of the Democratic Revolution and Confianza por Quintana Roo.

In January 2022 the coalition agreed that the nominee was selected by the PRD. For the candidate selection the party asked Parametría to do a poll with the three candidates. On 20 January the coalition announced the postulation of the deputy Laura Fernández Piña as the gubernatorial candidate.

Nominee 

 Laura Fernández Piña (PRD), member of the Chamber of Deputies from Quintana Roo 4th District.

Lost nomination 

 Mayuli Martínez Simón (PAN), Senator from Quintana Roo.
 Roberto Palazuelos (PRD), actor, model and producer.

Institutional Revolutionary Party 
The party decided against forming any coalition for the election.

Proposed 

 Leslie Hendricks Rubio (PRI), local deputy and daughter of former governor Joaquín Hendricks Díaz.

Citizens' Movement 
The party decided to go alone in the elections.

On 23 January, the party elected Roberto Palazuelos as their candidate for governor, however, on 18 February, Palazuelos declined his candidacy after it was rumored that Citizens' Movement planned to remove him from the nomination, because of several scandals and conservative positions. On the same day the party offered its candidacy to the incumbent Senator from Quintana Roo, José Luis Pech Várguez.

Nominee 

 José Luis Pech Várguez, Senator from Quintana Roo and 2016 Quintana Roo gubernatorial nominee for Morena. Previously went for the candidacy of Juntos Hacemos Historia.

Lost nomination 

 Marybel Villegas Canché (MC), Senator from Quintana Roo. Previously went for the candidacy of Juntos Hacemos Historia.
 Estefanía Mercado (MC), businesswoman.

Declined 

 Roberto Palazuelos (MC), actor, model and producer. Previously went for the candidacy of Va por México.

Juntos Hacemos Historia 
On 9 November 2021, the parties of Morena, Labor Party and the Ecologist Green Party of Mexico agreed to a coalition in the state elections under the name of Juntos Hacemos Historia. On 7 January 2022, the coalition registered with the addition of the parties Force for Mexico Quintana Roo and Movimiento Auténtico Social. However, on 17 January the party Movimiento Auténtico Social decided to separate from the coalition.

There were 8 candidates interested in the candidacy but only 5 were chosen for a poll in which Mara Lezama was the best positioned for the candidacy.

Nominee 

 Mara Lezama Espinosa (Morena), municipal president of Benito Juarez.

Lost nomination 

 José Luis Pech Várguez (Morena), Senator from Quintana Roo.
 Marybel Villegas Canché (Morena), Senator from Quintana Roo.
 Luis Alegre Salazar, Former deputy.
 Laura Beristain, municipal president of Solidaridad.
 Manuel Aguilar Ortega.
 Raúl Ojeda González, lawyer.
 Alfredo Kanter Culebro (Morena).

Movimiento Auténtico Social 
On 17 January 2022, the party decided to separate from the coalition Juntos Hacemos Historia and instead put their own candidates.

On 3 February 2022, the party choose Nivardo Mena Villanueva, former municipal president of Lázaro Cárdenas, as their nominee, because he was the only person interested in the nomination.

Nominee 

 Josué Nivardo Mena Villanueva, municipal president of Lázaro Cárdenas (2018-2021)

Polling data

By political party

By candidate

Results

Gubernatorial election

See also 

 2022 Mexican Local Elections

References 

 CÓMPUTOS QROO 2022(18 June 2022)

Quintana Roo
Quintana Roo
Quintana Roo gubernatorial election